The following is a list of Sephardic Jews. See also List of Iberian Jews.

This is a list of notable Jews of Sephardic ancestry.

This is an incomplete list, which may never be able to satisfy certain standards for completeness. Revisions and additions are welcome.

A 
 Isaac Abravanel (1437-1508), Portuguese-born Spanish philosopher, rabbi, economist and Orthodox Jewish theologist.
 José Aboulker (1920-2009), French resistance fighter and neurosurgeon.
 Senor Abravanel (1930-), Brazilian businessman, media tycoon and television host. Direct descendant of Isaac Abravanel.
 Abraham Amigo (1610-1683), Israeli rabbi of Sepharadi descent 
 Benjamin Artom (1835-1879), Haham of the Spanish and Portuguese Jews of Great Britain
 Lior Ashkenazi (1969-), Israeli actor
 Ben Ashkenazy (1968/69-), American billionaire real estate developer
 Moran Atias (1981-), Israeli-American actress
 Jacques Attali (1943-), Algerian-born French economist, advisor to President François Mitterrand from 1981 to 1991
 Hank Azaria (1964-) American actor, known for voicing many characters in the long-running animated series The Simpsons
 Max Azria (1949-2019) Tunisian-born American fashion designer

B 
 Yves Béhar (1967-), Swiss designer, entrepreneur and sustainability advocate
 Fabrice Benichou (1965-), French world champion boxer
 Judah P. Benjamin (1811-1884), American politician and statesman
 Aldo Bensadoun (1939-), Canadian businessman, founder of the ALDO Group
 Georges Bensoussan (1952-), French historian
 Maurice Berger, cultural historian, art critic, curator (Sephardic mother; father Ashkenazi Jew)
 John Berman (1972-),  news anchor for CNN.
 Miri Bohadana (1977-), Israeli actress, model, and presenter
 Can Bonomo (1987-), Turkish singer
 Alain de Botton (1969-), Swiss writer and philosopher (Sephardi father, Ashkenazi mother)
 Alain Boublil (1941-), Tunisian-born French lyricist of the musical Les Misérables
 Michel Boujenah (1952-), French comedian and actor
 Albert Bourla (1961-), Greek-born CEO of Pfizer
 Caryl Brahms (1901-1982), British writer
 June Brown (1927-2022), British actress
 Patrick Bruel (1959-), French singer and actor
 Tony Bullimore (1939-2018), British yachtsman

C 
 Neve Campbell (1973-), Canadian film and television actress (Scream)
 David Samuel Carasso, 19th-century traveler and writer
 Isaac (1874-1939) and Daniel Carasso (1905-2009), founders of Danone
 Benjamin N. Cardozo (1870-1938), Supreme Court Justice
 Gabrielle Carteris (1961-), American actress best known for her role in the TV series 90210
 Omri Casspi (1988-), Israeli NBA player
 Jacob Castello, 17th-century poet
 Joseph Cayre (1941-), co-founder of record label Salsoul Records, video tape distributor and producer GoodTimes Entertainment, and video game publisher GT Interactive
 Stanley Chera (1942-2020), American real estate developer
 Joseph Chetrit (1957-), American real estate investor and developer and founder of the Chetrit Group
 Élie Chouraqui (1957-), French Israeli film director
 Emmanuelle Chriqui (1975-), Canadian actress
 Hélène Cixous (1937-), Algerian-born French feminist critic
 Maurice Abraham Cohen (1851-1923), educator
 Claude Cohen-Tannoudji (1933-), French physicist. He shared the 1997 Nobel Prize in Physics
 Jean-François Copé (1964-), French politician; former President of the Union for a Popular Movement (UMP) Group in the French National Assembly; Sephardic mother
 Oliver Jackson-Cohen (1986-), English actor, notably played Luke Crain in The Haunting of Hill House
 Uriel da Costa (1585-1640), Portuguese philosopher and Orthodox-Jew theologist

D 
Jean Daniel (1920-2020), French journalist and author, founder of Le Nouvel Observateur
Pierre Darmon (1934-), French tennis player
Aryeh Deri (1959-), Moroccan-born Israeli politician & one of the founders of Shas.
Jacques Derrida (1930-2004), Algerian-born French philosopher
Benjamin Disraeli (1804-1881), Prime Minister of the United Kingdom 
Patrick Drahi (1963-), billionaire founder of international news channel i24news
Victor Drai (1947-), nightclub owner, entrepreneur and film producer.
Julien Dray (1955-), Algerian-born French politician, member of the National Assembly for the Socialist Party (PS)
Pierre Dukan (1941-), French physician, inventor of the Dukan Diet
Solomon Dwek (1973-) former American real estate investor and convicted felon

F 
Predrag Finci (1946-), Bosnian-British philosopher, author, and essayist

G 
 Meir Shmuel Gabay (1933-2010), first and only Israeli to be elected to the United Nations General Assembly for any office
 Yakir Gabay (1966-), Israeli-born billionaire who founded Aroundtown SA; son of Meir Shmuel Gabay
 David Galula (1919-1967), French military officer and counterinsurgency theoretician
 Sonia Gardner (1962-), co-founder of hedge fund Avenue Capital Management
 Sonny Gindi (1924-2012), co-founder of the Century 21department store
 Eyal Golan (1971-), Israeli singer (Sephardic and Yemenite descent)
 Lewis Goldsmith (1763-1846), Anglo-French journalist and political writer
 Eydie Gormé (born Edith Gormezano, 1928–2013), American singer
 Eva Green (1980-), French actress and model
 Philip Guedalla (1889-1944), biographer
 Denis Guedj (1940-2010), French mathematician and writer
 David Guetta (1967-), French DJ (Sephardic father)

H 
 Joseph Hackmey Israeli businessman and art collector
 Tzachi Halevy (1975-), Israeli actor best known for the TV series Fauda
 Alphonse Halimi (1932-2006), French world champion boxer
 Gisèle Halimi (1927-2020), French civil rights advocate and feminist
 Serge Halimi (1955-), French journalist and newspaper editor
 Eli Harari, founder of SanDisk
 Serge Haroche (1944-), French physicist
 Sir Joshua Hassan (1915-1997), Gibraltarian politician, and first Mayor and Chief Minister of Gibraltar
 Jacob Hassan (1936-2006), Spanish academic, writer, and university professor
 Daniel G. Hedaya (1940-), American actor
 Sir Basil Henriques (1890-1961), philanthropist
 Jack Hidary, technology entrepreneur and researcher
 Murray Hidary (1971-), composer, fine art photographer and entrepreneur

J 
 Agnès Jaoui (1964-), French actress
 Mitchell R. Julis (1955-), co-founding partner of Los Angeles hedge fund Canyon Capital Advisors

K 
 Moshe Kahlon (1960-), Israeli politician, Minister of Finance since 2015
 Paul Kodish (1965-), British professional drummer

L 
 Albert Laboz, New York City real estate developer
 Marc Lasry (1959-), American billionaire financier 
 Mélanie Laurent (1983-), French actress, singer, pianist, director, and screenwriter
 Emma Lazarus (1849-1887), U.S. poet, best remembered for her sonnet engraved on the Statue of Liberty 
 Rita Levi-Montalcini (1909-2012), Italian physician and neurobiologist
 Bernard-Henri Lévy (1948-), French philosopher
 David Levy (1937-), former Deputy Prime Minister, Minister of Foreign Affairs, Minister of Immigrant Absorption, Minister of Housing and Construction and as a Minister without Portfolio 
 Eugene Levy (1946-) Canadian actor 
 Jackie Levy (1960-), Israeli politician and former mayor of Beit She'an
 Orly Levy (1973-), Israeli politician and former member of Yisrael Beiteinu

M 
 Enrico Macias (1938-), Algerian-born French singer (born Gaston Ghrenassia)
 Mickaël Madar (1968-), French football player
Moishe Mana (1956-), Israeli-born American billionaire, real estate developer
 Shiri Maimon (1981-), Israeli singer, actress, and television personality
 Maimonides (1138-1204), Mediaeval rabbi and philosopher
 Paul Marciano (1952-), co-founder of Guess? Inc.
 Phil Margo (1942-), American musician, member of The Tokens
 David Mazouz (2001-), American actor best known for Gotham (TV series)
 Lea Michele (1986-), American actress best known for Glee (TV series)
 Fred Melamed (1956-), American actor and writer
 Raphael Meldola (1849-1915), British chemist and first president of the Maccabaeans
 Raphael Meldola (1754-1828), English rabbi
 Pierre Mendès France (1907-1982), French politician, Prime Minister 1954-55
 Daniel Mendoza (1764-1836), 19th-century English pugilist, prizefighter
 David Mimran, film producer and director; married to former Sports Illustrated Swimsuit model Julie Ordon; son of Jean-Claude Mimran.
 Jean Claude Mimran (1945-), French businessman & former owner of Lamborghini; father of David Mimran; brother of Patrick Mimran
 Patrick Mimran (1956-), former owner & CEO of Lamborghini; brother of Jean Claude Mimran & uncle of David Mimran
 Yosef Mizrachi (1968-), Israeli-born haredi rabbi based in Monsey, New York
 Ken Moelis (1958-), American businessman and billionaire, founder of Moelis & Company
 Frederic Mocatta (1828-1905), English philanthropist 
 Amedeo Modigliani (1884-1920), Italian painter
 Moses Montefiore (1784-1885), British financier and banker, activist, philanthropist and Sheriff of London
 Edgar Morin (1921-), French sociologist and philosopher (born Edgar Nahoum)
 Shelley Morrison (1936-2019), American actress best known for her roles Sr Sixto on The Flying Nun and Rosario Salazar on Will & Grace
 Georges Moustaki (1934-2013), French singer-songwriter

N 

 David Nahmad (1947-), billionaire fine art dealer
 Ezra Nahmad (1945-), billionaire art collector and dealer
 Helly Nahmad (London) (1978-), owner of Helly Nahmad London, and son of Ezra Nahmad
 Helly Nahmad (New York art collector) (1976-), owner of Helly Nahmad Gallery in New York, and son of Ezra's brother David Nahmad
 Moses ben Nahman (1194-1270), medieval Jewish scholar and rabbi
 Géraldine Nakache (1980-), French actress, director, and screenwriter
 Joseph Nakash (1942-), co-founder of Jordache Enterprises, Inc.

O 
 Jerry Orbach (1935-2004), actor best known for roles in Dirty Dancing, Beauty and the Beast, and Law & Order

P 
 Abraham Palacci (1809/10-1898), grand rabbi of Izmir
 Rahamim Nissim Palacci (1813-1907), grand rabbi of Izmir
 Joseph Palacci (1815-1896), rabbi of Izmir
 Charles Palache (1869-1954), American mineralogist
 Haim Palachi (1788-1868), grand rabbi of Izmir
 Samuel Pallache (1550-1616), Moroccan-Dutch envoy, corsair
 Joseph De la Penha (fl.1697), Dutch trader 
 Murray Perahia (1947-), American concert pianist
 Rafi Peretz (1956-), Israeli Minister of Education
 Victor Perez (1911-1945), Tunisian boxer
 Abraham Cohen Pimentel (?-1697), Head Rabbi of the Portuguese / Spanish Synagogue of Amsterdam
 Azaria Piccio (1579-1647), Venetian
 Daniel Pinto (financier) (1966-), British-French financier
 Inês Pires, mistress of King John I of Portugal; ancestor of Dukes and Portuguese Kings of the House of Braganza and many of European royalty and nobility
. Principe/Prince family

R 
 Lior Raz (1971-), Israeli screenwriter and actor best known for starring in Fauda
 Miri Regev (1965-), Israeli MK of Likud
 David Ricardo (1772-1823), British political economist
 Daniela Ruah (1983-), Portuguese-American actress
 Rudy Rochman  (1993-), Israeli Zionist activist

S 
Haim Saban (1944-), Israeli-American billionaire who founded Saban Entertainment
Elvio Sadun (1918-1974), Italian-American scientist and WWII Italian partisan 
Safdie brothers, American independent film directors
Fortuna Safdié (1958-), Brazilian singer, composer and Ladino-Revivalist.
Haym Salomon (1740-1785), Polish-born American businessman who helped finance the American Revolutionary War 
Roberto Saviano (1979-), Italian writer
Hugh Sebag Montefiore (1955-), British Historian and Lawyer
Simon Sebag Montefiore (1965-), British historian
Jerry Seinfeld (1954-), American stand-up comedian known for playing titular character in TV series Seinfeld
Vic Seixas (1923-), American Hall of Fame former top-10 tennis player
Peter Sellers (1925-1980), British comedian and actor; Knight of the Realm (Richard Henry Sellers)
David Serero (1974-), French architect; sephardi ancestors from Morocco
David Serero (1981-), French opera singer and actor; Sephardi ancestors from Morocco
Silvan Shalom (1958-), former Deputy Prime Minister and Minister of Finance in Israel
Jamie-Lynn Sigler (1981-), American actress and singer
Joseph Sitt (1964-), founder of global real estate company Thor Equities
Raphael Soriano (1904-1988), Rhodes-born California mid-century modern architect
Baruch Spinoza (1632-1677), Dutch philosopher of Sephardic Portuguese origin
Henry Stern (California politician) (1982-), California State Senator
Dominique Strauss-Kahn (1949-), French politician; Finance Minister, 1997–99; President of the International Monetary Fund, 2007–11; Sephardic mother
Jeff Sutton (real estate developer) (1960-), American real estate developer and billionaire

T 
Alona Tal (1983-), Israeili singer and actress
Shaun Toub (1963-), Iranian-American actor
Isaac Touro (1738-1783), Touro College named in his honor. Touro Syn Father of Judah Touro.
Judah Touro (1775-1854), American businessmen & philanthropist. Touro College & Touro Synagogue are named in his honor.
Gilbert Trigano (1920-2001), French businessman, developer of Club Med 
Yitzhak Tshuva (1948-), Israeli businessman and chairman of El-Ad Group

V 

 ״Nani״ Noam Vazana (1982-), Israeli-Portuguese Singer, Trombonist and Composer and CEO of Why DIY Music

W 
Len Wein (1948-2017), American comic book writer & co-creator of DC Comics' Swamp Thing and Marvel Comics' Wolverine

Z 
Ahmed Zayat (born 1962), owner of Thoroughbred racehorses and Triple Crown winner American Pharaoh
Éric Zemmour (born 1958), French polemist and politician

See also
List of Iberian Jews
Sephardi Jews
Lists of Jews
List of Portuguese
List of Spaniards
Spanish Inquisition
Portuguese Inquisition

Footnotes 

 
Sephardic Jews
Jews,Sephardic